The Angel Who Pawned Her Harp is a 1954 British fantasy comedy film directed by Alan Bromly and starring Felix Aylmer, Diane Cilento and Jerry Desmonde. The film was based on a novel by Charles Terrot and is a remake of his television play broadcast in 1951. It was shot in black and white at Beaconsfield Studios with location shooting around Islington in London. The film's sets were designed by the art director Ray Simm. It was remade as a West German film of the same title in 1959.

Premise 
A beautiful blonde angel (Diane Cilento) arrives in Islington in London on a goodwill mission to soften the heart of pawnbroker Joshua Webman (Felix Aylmer) who specialises in old musical instruments. To raise money for her mission, she tries to pawn her harp to him. This is done through organising a "chance meeting" in the pub with a man. Webman eventually gives in and pays £300 for the harp but is disappointed when other experts tell him that it is only worth £15.

Bringing out the best in the people she meets, she shows them the path down which their happiness lies.

Cast 

 Felix Aylmer as pawnbroker Joshua Webman
 Diane Cilento as the Angel
 Jerry Desmonde as Parker
 Robert Eddison as the Voice
 Joe Linnane as Ned Sullivan
 Phyllis Morris as Mrs. Trap
 Sheila Sweet as Jenny Lane
 Philip Guard as Len Burrows
 Genitha Halsey as Mrs. Burrows
 Edward Evans as Sergeant Lane
 Elaine Wodson as Mrs. Lane
 Thomas Gallagher as Boyd
 Alfie Bass as Lennox
 June Ellis as Sally
 Herbert C. Walton as Mr. Meek
 Freddie Watts as Bookmaker
 Maurice Kaufmann as Reg
 David Kossoff as Schwartz
 Raymond Rollett as Stillvane
 Cyril Smith as Dog Owner
 Jean Aubrey as Sue
 Thomas Moore as Small Boy
 Nelson's Gift as Spiderflash

Critical reception
Leonard Maltin dismissed the film as "Slight, forgettable fare". Allmovie called it "disposable"; TV Guide described it as a "Well-made, charming British picture with the standard seriocomic blend of 1950s English films". Sky Movies praised Diane Cilento, "charm itself as the Angel," and appreciated a "whimsical Ealing-style comedy which keeps its feet firmly on the ground, spreading chuckles instead of sentiment and providing polished frolics in the process. Felix Aylmer - brilliant as the hard-bitten pawnbroker - Jerry Desmonde, Alfie Bass and a first-rate supporting cast help to put a high gloss on these heavenly capers".

See also
 List of films about angels

References

External links 
 

1954 films
1954 comedy films
British comedy films
1950s English-language films
British black-and-white films
Films based on British novels
Films set in London
Films shot in London
Films about angels
Films scored by Antony Hopkins
Films shot at Beaconsfield Studios
British Lion Films films
1950s British films